The Stick Up is a 1977 British romantic comedy crime film written and directed by Jeffrey Bloom and starring David Soul. It was executive produced by Elliott Kastner.

It was one of the first films from financier Arnon Milchan although he felt the film was so bad he had his name removed from the credits.

The film was known during production as Mud.

Plot

Cast 
 David Soul as  Duke Turnbeau
 Pamela McMyler as Rosie McCratchit
 Johnnie Wade as Smiley 
 Michael Balfour as Sam
 Michael McStay as Mechanic
 Tony Melody as First Policeman
 Norman Jones as Second Policeman
 Mike Savage as Lorry Driver
 Gordon Gostelow as Farmer
 Connie Vascott as Farmer's Wife
 Leslie Hardy as Farmer's Child
 Julie May as Prison Matron  
 Nosher Powell as Manager 
 Alan Tilvern as Richie
 Robert Longden as Second Roadblock Policeman

References

External links

1977 films
1977 romantic comedy films
1970s crime comedy films
British romantic comedy films
British crime comedy films
Films set in 1935
1970s English-language films
Films directed by Jeffrey Bloom
1970s British films
Romantic crime films